Trzęsacz may refer to the following places in Poland:
Trzęsacz, Gryfice County in West Pomeranian Voivodeship (north-west Poland)
Trzęsacz, Kuyavian-Pomeranian Voivodeship (north-central Poland)
Trzęsacz, Człuchów County in Pomeranian Voivodeship (north Poland)
Trzęsacz, Choszczno County in West Pomeranian Voivodeship (north-west Poland)